Margot Seidler is a former East German slalom canoeist who competed in the 1950s. She won a gold medal in the mixed C-2 team event at the 1957 ICF Canoe Slalom World Championships in Augsburg.

References

External links 
 Margot SEIDLER at CanoeSlalom.net

Possibly living people
East German female canoeists
Year of birth missing (living people)
Place of birth missing (living people)
Medalists at the ICF Canoe Slalom World Championships